This is a list of the National Register of Historic Places listings in Great Smoky Mountains National Park.

This is intended to be a complete list of the properties and districts on the National Register of Historic Places in Great Smoky Mountains National Park, North Carolina and Tennessee, United States.  The locations of National Register properties and districts for which the latitude and longitude coordinates are included below, may be seen in a map.

There are 19 properties and districts listed on the National Register in the park.

Current listings 

|--
|}

See also 
 National Register of Historic Places listings in Sevier County, Tennessee
 National Register of Historic Places listings in Blount County, Tennessee
 National Register of Historic Places listings in Cocke County, Tennessee
 National Register of Historic Places listings in Swain County, North Carolina
 National Register of Historic Places listings in Tennessee
 National Register of Historic Places listings in North Carolina

References 

Great Smoky Mountains National Park
Great Smoky Mountains National Park